Don and Sherri is an EP released by Matthew Dear on Ghostly International Records on October 16, 2007.  It was released simultaneously on 12" and digital download.  It features a remix by M.A.N.D.Y., a cover by Hot Chip, and a remix of "Elementary Lover" by DJ Koze of Fischmob.

Track listing

12"
A1. "Don and Sherri" - 3:24
A2. "Don and Sherri (M.A.N.D.Y. Remix)" - 7:38
B1. "Don and Sherri (Hot Chip Version)" - 4:15
B2. "Don and Sherri (Hot Chip Version Instrumental)" - 4:15
B3. "Elementary Lover (DJ Koze Remix) - 3:53

Digital Download
"Don and Sherri" - 3:24
"Don and Sherri (M.A.N.D.Y. Remix) [Radio Edit]" - 3:55
"Don and Sherri (Hot Chip Version)" - 4:15
"Don and Sherri (Hot Chip Version Instrumental)" - 4:15
"Elementary Lover (DJ Koze Remix) - 3:53

References 

2007 EPs
Matthew Dear albums